Alexander & James is an online store that sells  scotch and Irish whiskies, gins and vodkas, as well as accessories, gift sets and additional services such as engraving. The drinks corporation Diageo owns Alexander & James, and it is their first e-commerce venture in the UK and Germany.

Background
The e-commerce site first launched in the UK early 2013. The German version of the site was launched in August 2013. At the time of the company’s launch, a number of financial institutions commented on Diageo’s move to create an e-commerce site.

The name of the company derives from spirits specialists, Alexander Walker II and James Buchanan.

Alexander & James stocks a number of spirits, including Johnnie Walker, Zacapa, Don Julio, Tanqueray and Cîroc and a range of single malt whiskies. The website also sells glasses, gift sets, and co-branded products such as the Bushmills x Grado headphones.

The online store provides packaging and bottle engraving for its clients. Each product that is sold on the site comes complete with the historical information and serving suggestions.

Mechanics
The website has been created so that clients who are knowledgeable about spirits can select products using a variety of filters. In addition to common filters such as price and brand, Alexander & James allows visitors to filter using aroma, region, flavour and character.

Magazine
At the time of the brand’s foundation, an online magazine was also launched. The magazine is updated monthly and features articles on the history of particular spirits, cocktail recipes, features and interviews, news on upcoming events and tastings, seasonal cocktail recipes and bartender tips.

Awards
In 2013, the website was nominated for an AWWARDS online web award and went on to win the Webaward 2013 from The Web Marketing Association. The company was also recognized by Luxury Daily as one of the Top 10 digital marketers in Q1 2013.

References

British companies established in 2013
Drink companies of the United Kingdom
Diageo